The Best of Bill Cosby (1969) is the 12th album by Bill Cosby.

It is his first compilation album containing favorites from his tenure with Warner Bros. Records, which had just been completed earlier that year. The liner notes were by David Ossman of the comedy group The Firesign Theatre.

Track listing
Some of the track titles on this album differ from those on the albums from which they were taken. Where applicable, the original titles are shown in parentheses.

Side 1
 Noah: Right! – 2:05 (from Bill Cosby Is a Very Funny Fellow...Right!)
 Noah: And the Neighbor – 1:43 (from ...Right!)
 Noah: Me and You, Lord – 3:11 (from ...Right!)
 Revenge – 5:58 (from Revenge)
 The Lone Ranger – 0:55 (from I Started Out as a Child)
 Old Weird Harold (9th Street Bridge) – 5:12 (from Revenge)

Side 2
 Driving in San Francisco – 3:45 (from Why Is There Air?)
 The Apple – 1:43 (from To Russell, My Brother, Whom I Slept With)
 Babies (Baby) – 3:49 (from Why Is There Air?)
 The Water Bottle – 0:58 (from I Started Out...)
 Street Football – 1:17 (from I Started Out...)
 Fat Albert (Buck, Buck) – 9:05 (from Revenge)

"The Lone Ranger", as presented on this album, is a truncated (shortened) version of the original recording.

The cassette tape release of the album reverses Sides 1 and 2 of the LP in order to sequence the longer side first.

British track listing
In 1967, an album of the same title was released in England by Warner Brothers (K46002), but with a different track listing and different cover art (it used the same photo as the cover of Wonderfulness for its front cover, and the photo and liner notes of Why Is There Air? for its back cover).

Side One
 Medic (from I Started Out...)
 Go Carts (from Wonderfulness)
 $75 Car (from Why Is There Air?)
 Noah: Right!
 Noah: And the Neighbor
 Noah: Me and You, Lord

Side Two
 Tonsils (from Wonderfulness)
 Kindergarten (from Why Is There Air?)
 The Playground (from Wonderfulness)

Certifications

References

Bill Cosby compilation albums
Spoken word albums by American artists
Live spoken word albums
1969 greatest hits albums
Warner Records compilation albums
1960s comedy albums
1960s spoken word albums